Gonzalo Díaz may refer to:

 Gonzalo Díaz (footballer, born 1990), Argentine midfielder
 Gonzalo Díaz (footballer, born 1996), Argentine midfielder